Everetts may refer to:

 Everetts, North Carolina, USA; a town in Martin County
 Everetts Historic District
 Everetts Creek, Kentucky, USA; former name of the city of Independence and the watercourse  Cruises Creek
 John Everetts (1873–1956), U.S. Navy sailor
 Everetts barb, a species of fish
 Everetts bulbul, a species of bird

See also

 Everetts Corner, Delaware, USA
 
 Everett (disambiguation)